Beesenstedt is a village and a former municipality in the district Saalekreis, in Saxony-Anhalt, Germany. Since January 1, 2010, it has been part of the municipality Salzatal.

Former municipalities in Saxony-Anhalt
Salzatal